Rukshmani Kumari (born 1979) is an Indian politician, affiliated with Indian National Congress, who is currently serving as the Rajasthan state unit president of All India Professionals Congress, the professional wing of Indian National Congress in Rajasthan.

She is member of Rajasthan Pradesh Congress Committee. Kumari hails from the erstwhile noble family of Chomu Thikana.

Career 
On 26 January 2018, Kumari was appointed as the Rajasthan President of All India Professionals Congress, the professional wing of Indian National Congress. In 2016, she founded an NGO called Star Foundation, which works for the development of women and underprivileged children in rural Rajasthan. She also serves as the president of Rajasthan Women Football Association.

Personal life 
She was married to Major Aditya Singh, who was martyred in 2011, during an operation in Kashmir.

Other activities 
Kumari voiced her opposition to any "factual distortion" in the 2018 Deepika-Ranveer starer film, Padmaavat, along with Gajendra Singh Shekhawat and Diya Kumari, reportedly by New Indian Express.

See also 

 All India Professionals Congress
 Indian National Congress
 Rajasthan Pradesh Congress Committee

References

External links 
 नारी सशक्तिकरण की मिसाल रुक्क्षमणी कुमारी (Interview)

1979 births
Living people
People from Rajasthan
Rajasthani politicians
Indian National Congress politicians from Rajasthan
Indian women activists